"Gimme Some Love" is a song recorded by Australian singer Gina G from her debut album, Fresh! (1997). Released in August 1997, it was the fifth single release by Gina G (though the catalogue number indicates it may have been planned to be released ahead of "Ti Amo") and the second single to be released in the US. She wrote it with Bob Wainwright, John Collins, Mark Taylor and Richard Burton. The second UK CD release contained remixes of "Higher Than Love", a Motiv8-produced song from the Fresh! album, which had previously been released on promotional vinyl. In the UK, "Gimme Some Love" peaked at number 25 (her last top 40 hit), spending just two weeks in the UK top 75 and a further three weeks in the top 200.

Critical reception
Patrick McDonald from The Advertiser noted that the singer "dances on the edge of a techno beat" with "Gimme Some Love". J.D. Considine from The Baltimore Sun remarked the song's "pumping house beats". Larry Flick from Billboard wrote, "Hot on the heels of "Ooh Aah...Just A Little Bit" comes this frenetic Euro-NRG stomper. Hard as it may be to believe, the hook here is just as quick and catchy as its predecessor, and Gina's wide-eyed performance bursts with infectious glee. Expect to be bouncing to this well into the spring season—and use it as an excuse to dip into the singer's festive full-length set "Fresh"." Richard Paton from The Blade complimented the "irresistible grooves" of the song. 

British magazine Music Week rated it three out of five, viewing it as "another breathless uptempo track from Gina's undeservedly overlooked album. It has spent nine weeks on the Billboard Hot 100 and should see significant chart action here." A reviewer from People Magazine commented, "Don't be surprised to find yourself high on the giddiness of impossibly catchy numbers like "Follow the Light" and "Gimme Some Love"". Pop Rescue said the song has "tons of house piano and synth sequences, and a bass and drum sequence that sounds like it’s popped round after finishing working for contemporaries 2 Unlimited or Culture Beat."

Chart performance
"Gimme Some Love" was a moderate success on the charts, reaching the top 10 on the RPM Dance/Urban chart and the top 50 on the RPM Top Singles chart in Canada, the top 20 in Scotland and the top 30 in the United Kingdom. In the latter, the single peaked at number 25 in its first week at the UK Singles Chart, on August 31, 1997. But on the UK Pop Tip Chart, it went to number one for several weeks. It was Gina G's last top 40 hit in the UK. In the US, the song peaked at number 46 on the Billboard Hot 100. And on the Eurochart Hot 100, it peaked at number 54. In Oceania, it charted in Gina G's native Australia, reaching only number 121.

Track listings

 CD maxi, UK (WEA0101CD1)
"Gimme Some Love" (Radio Edit) — 3:31
 "Gimme Some Love" (Metro's Extended Eurobeat Mix) — 5:47
 "Gimme Some Love" (Hysteric Ego "Rahh Mix") — 6:45
 "Gimme Some Love" (Andy & The Lamboy Mix) — 7:05
 "Gimme Some Love" (Fitch Bros. Exit Boston) — 8:36

 CD maxi, UK (WEA101CD2)
 "Gimme Some Love" (Album Version) — 3:30
 "Higher Than Love" (Motiv8 Pumptronic 12" Mix) — 6:48
 "Higher Than Love" (Motiv8 Steinway Mix) — 7:34
 "Higher Than Love" (Rhythm Masters Mix) — 5:43

Other versions:
"Gimme Some Love" (Gimme Some Dub (Stewman's Edit)) (6:46) - from the US release
"Gimme Some Love" (Fitch Bros. Symphony No. 4 In B Flat Minor) (10:20) - from the US release
"Gimme Some Love" (Fitch Bros. Exit Boston Radio Edit) (3:42) - from the US promotional 12"
"Higher Than Love" (Motiv8 7" Edit) (3:46) - an alternate name for the version on the album Fresh!
"Higher Than Love" (Riffmatic Vocal Mix) - from the UK promotional 12"

Charts

References

1997 singles
1997 songs
Gina G songs
Warner Records singles
Songs written by Mark Taylor (record producer)